Naya Khoon is a 1990 Indian Bollywood action film directed by Rajat Rakshit. The film stars Govinda, Mandakini in pivotal roles.

Cast
 Govinda as Dr. Anand
 Mandakini as Dr. Seema Rai
 Saeed Jaffrey as Veerendra Pratap Rai
 Raza Murad as Vikram Pratap Rai
 Gulshan Grover as Dr. Anil Verma
 Rita Bhaduri as Sapna Shrivastav
 Bharat Bhushan as Mr. Shrivastav

Soundtrack 
All songs were written by Indeevar.

References

External links

1990s Hindi-language films
Films scored by Usha Khanna
1990 films
Indian action films